Arctic Figure Skating Club (AFSC): located at Arctic Edge Ice arena in Canton, Michigan.  A probationary club in 2003 became a full member of U.S. Figure Skating in 2004 and has risen quickly in membership and prominence.

Coaching staff
All coaches are Members of US Figure Skating and Professional Skating Association. Their own accomplishments contribute to the great success of training.

Skaters Highlights
Skaters from all over the world have trained at the club. They have achieved medals in Regional, World, National, and Olympic competitions. There are many accomplishments from the skaters. Some include:

In 2009, Meryl Davis and partner Charlie White won the National Championship in ice dancing, along with 6 gold and 2 bronze at National and World Competitions.
Alissa Czisny won Skate Canada in 2005, in 2004 won the US Collegiate Championships and got a bronze medal at the 2006 US Championships.
Benjamin Augusto and Tanith Belbin won the silver medal at the 2006 Winter Olympic games.
Brooke Castile and Benjamin Okolski won the gold at the 2008 National Championship in pairs.
In 2008, Madison Chock and partner Greg Zuerlein received the gold medal in 3 Junior Grand Prix's and a gold in the Junior US Championships.Tessa Virtue and partner Scott Moir, since 2005 have received 10 gold, 6 silver, and 4 bronze medals at National and World Competitions.
Shannon Wingle and Tim McKernan were pewter medalists in 2009.
There are many more accomplishments from other skaters, such as Jamie Silverstein and partner Ryan O'Meara, Zhang Dan and partner Zhang Hao, Kendra Moyle and partner Steven Pottenger.

Events/Programs

References

Figure skating clubs in the United States
Sports clubs established in 2003
Sports in Michigan